Monellia is a genus of true bugs belonging to the family Aphididae.

The species of this genus are found in Northern America.

Species:

Monellia caryella 
Monellia hispida 
Monellia maculella 
Monellia medina 
Monellia microsetosa

References

Aphididae